Athanase Bala (2 March 1927 – 3 September 2019) was a Cameroonian Roman Catholic bishop.

Bala was born in Cameroon and was ordained to the priesthood in 1955. He served as titular bishop of Gegi and coadjutor bishop of the Roman Catholic Diocese of Bafia, Cameroon, from 1976 until 1977. Bala then served as bishop of the Bafia Diocese from 1977 until 2003.

Notes

1927 births
2019 deaths
21st-century Roman Catholic bishops in Cameroon
20th-century Roman Catholic bishops in Cameroon
Roman Catholic bishops of Bafia